Oldřich Lipský (4 July 1924 – 19 October 1986) was a Czech film director and screenwriter, brother of actor Lubomír Lipský.

All his films were comedies, frequently employing themes of Dadaism, farce and magical realism.  He was a frequent collaborator with actor Miloš Kopecký, who appeared in most of his works.

He was creating film before, during and after the Prague Spring.

Selected filmography
 The Hen and the Sexton (1951)
 Haškovy povídky ze starého mocnářství (1952)
 Cirkus bude! (1954)
 Jaroslav Hasek's Exemplary Cinematograph (1955)
 Hvězda jede na jih (1958)
 Man in Outer Space (1961)
 Lemonade Joe (1964)
 Happy End (1966)
 I Killed Einstein, Gentlemen (1969)
 Four Murders Are Enough, Darling (1971)
 Straw Hat (1971)
 Circus in the Circus (1974)
 Jáchyme, hoď ho do stroje! (1974)
 Marecek, Pass Me the Pen! (1976)
 Dinner for Adele (1977)
 Long Live Ghosts! (1977)
 The Mysterious Castle in the Carpathians (1981)
 Srdečný pozdrav ze zeměkoule (1983)
 The Three Veterans (1984)

External links

Biography 

1924 births
1986 deaths
People from Pelhřimov
Czechoslovak film directors
Film directors from Prague